The 2013–14 Bahraini FA Cup or more commonly known locally as the BFA Cup is the 8th edition of this Association football tournament, and the first since 2009. Al-Muharraq are therefore going into the competition as defending champions.

This edition will feature two groups of 8 and 9 teams respectively with the top two teams advancing to the semi final stage. Each group sees the teams play each other once. Games are generally played during international breaks and feature all teams from the top two tiers of Bahraini football.

The competition is, in theory, used to blood new up and coming talent but has had its fair share of disciplinary incidents including a result awarded due to the ineligibility of players used.

Group stage

Group A

Results

Group B

Semi-finals

Final

References

FA Cup
Bahraini FA Cup seasons